John Arthur Norlander (March 5, 1921 – March 6, 2002) was an American professional basketball player born in Virginia, Minnesota.

A 6'3" forward from Hamline University, where he joined Theta Chi fraternity, Norlander played five seasons (1946–1951) in the Basketball Association of America and National Basketball Association as a member of the Washington Capitols. He averaged 8.3 points per game in his BAA/NBA career. Norlander played in the Eastern Professional Basketball League (EPBL) for York Victory A.C. during the 1950–51 season and was named to the All-EPBL Second Team. He died one day after his 81st birthday in 2002.

BAA/NBA career statistics

Regular season

Playoffs

References

External links

1921 births
2002 deaths
American men's basketball players
Baltimore Bullets (1944–1954) players
Basketball players from Minnesota
Forwards (basketball)
Hamline Pipers men's basketball players
People from Virginia, Minnesota
Washington Capitols players